Saint Michael's Institution (abbreviated SMI) a school in Ipoh, Kinta District, Perak, Malaysia. It is situated on Jalan SP Seenivasagam, formerly Clayton Road. Within the same compound are two primary schools, St Michael's I and II. 

St Michael's Institution is part of the La Sallian worldwide community of schools.

List Of Brother Directors And Principals 
St. Michael's Institution is part of the Lasallian Educational Institutions. SMI's two alumni associations (the Old Michaelians' Association and the Klang Valley SMI Alumni Association) belong to the Malaysian Federation of Lasallian Associations (MFOLSA), the umbrella organisation for all Lasallian alumni associations in Malaysia.

Brother Directors and Principals
 1912 - 1920 : PJ Mor Singh
 1920 - 1921 : Brother Paul Gallagher
 1921 - 1924 : Brother V Augustus
 1925 - 1929 : Brother Sigolin Henry
 1926 : Brother V Joseph
 1930 - 1935 : Brother Dositheus
 1936 - 1938 : Brother Finan Ryan
 1938 : Brother Marcian Cullen
 1938 - 1948 : Brother Patrick O Donovan
 1948 - 1955 : Brother Denis Hyland
 1955 - 1960 : Brother Pius Kelly
 1961 - 1971 : Brother Ultan Paul Rosario
 1972 - 1975 : Brother Vincent J Corkery
 1975 - 1985 : Brother Ultan Paul Rosario
 1986 - 1988 : Brother Vincent J Corkery
 1989 - 1991 : Chong Suan Ee
 1992 - 1994 : K. Balasubramaniam
 1995 - 1998 : Teh Chor Aun
 1999 - 2005 : Louis Rozario Doss
 2006 - 2011 : Phoon Chong Chee
 2011 - 2015 : Loh Wei Seng
 2015 – 2017 : Chan Nyook Ying
 2017 - 2018: Gunalan Tony
 2018 - 2022 : Sit Wai Yin
 2022–Present : Phoon Kean Loon

Notable alumni
 Lee Loy Seng, founder of KLK Bhd
 Michael Chang Min Tat, Federal Court judge and Commissioner of Law Revision and Law Reform
 Lim Keng Yaik, former president of the Gerakan Party and Minister of Energy, Water and Communications
 Paul Leong Khee Seong, former Minister of Primary Industries and former Deputy President of the Gerakan Party
 Ahmad Husni Hanadzlah,  former Second Minister of Finance of Malaysia
 John Thivy, 1st President of Malaysian Indian Congress (MIC)
 Leong Yew Koh, first Governor (Yang di-Pertua Negeri) of Malacca
 Lee Lam Thye, former politician and national activist
 Gregory Yong Sooi Ngean, Catholic Archbishop Emeritus of Singapore
 Yeoh Ghim Seng, former speaker of the Parliament of Singapore, former vice-president of Singapore and acting president of Singapore
 Tan Yee Khan, All England badminton doubles champion 1965 and 1966 
 Koo Kien Keat, Badminton Doubles World Championship Silver Medallist 2010
 Peter Pek, first publisher of Superbrands Malaysia, host of reality television series The Firm, and host of Brand Malaysia with Peter Pek Yeoh Eng-kiong, Secretary for Health, Welfare and Food of Hong Kong
 Patrick Teoh, DJ and actor in Malaysia and Singapore
 Ismail Omar, 9th and former inspector general of Royal Malaysian Police 

Trivia
 Bernard Chauly's Goodbye Boys'' is about eight scouts from the 02 Kinta Troop of St. Michael's who set out on a hundred-kilometer expedition. The school is seen in scenes throughout the movie. The movie is based on Chauly's similar experience as a scout during his days at St. Michael's.
 Vincent Corkery was conferred the Darjah Dato' Paduka Mahkota Perak (DPMP) by the Sultan of Perak in 2010 in recognition of his contributions to education and SMI.

References

External links

 

Secondary schools in Malaysia
Educational institutions established in 1912
Lasallian schools in Malaysia
Catholic schools in Malaysia
1912 establishments in British Malaya
Publicly funded schools in Malaysia
Boys' schools in Malaysia